The Commander of Army Strategic Reserves Command (abbreviated as ) is the highest position of Army Strategic Reserves Command or Kostrad. Kostrad falls under the army chief of staff for training, personnel, and administration.

Commander of Army Strategic Reserves Command is considered a path to obtaining a high government position in Indonesia. Many of its commanders have become very senior Indonesian leaders including Soeharto, who became President; Rudini, who became Minister of Home Affairs; Wirahadikusumah, who would later become Vice-president; Ryamizard Ryacudu, who would become Chief of Staff of the Army and Minister of Defence; and numerous commanders who would later become Chief of Staff of the Army and later on as Commander of the Indonesian National Armed Forces.

List of Commander of Army Strategic Command

See also
Indonesian National Armed Forces
Indonesian Army

References

Indonesian Army